This is a list of fictional concepts in Artemis Fowl, a novel series by Eoin Colfer.

Fairy concepts

Bio-bomb
A high-tech, fairy-manufactured guided missile, also known as a "bio-bomb" or a "blue-rinse" because of its blue colour. Once detonated, it employs the radioactive energy source Solinium 2 (an element not yet discovered by humans), destroying all living tissue in the area while leaving landscape and buildings untouched. It was used on Fowl Manor in Artemis Fowl, and, later, in Artemis Fowl and the Opal Deception, Opal Koboi manufactures a larger missile-guided bio-bomb and a compact bio-bomb with a plasma screen that can only be blocked by the rigid polymer used in the manufacturing of LEP helmets.

Book of the People 
The Book of the People is the Fairy bible, known by the fairies themselves simply as the Book. It is written in Gnommish, the fairy language. As it contains the history of the People and their life teachings, Artemis Fowl manages to secure a copy from an alcoholic fairy in Ho Chi Minh City and use it to kidnap Holly Short, and to decode Gnommish. The first few lines are included in the first book.

Some of the first lines are:
 The Booke of the People.
 Being instructions to our magicks
 and life rules.

 Carry me always, carry me well.
 I am thy teacher of herb and spell.
 I am thy link to power arcane.
 Forget me and thy magick shall wane.

 Ten times ten commandments there be.
 They will answer every mystery.
 Cures, curses, alchemy.
 These secrets shall be thine, through me.

 But, Fairy, remember this above all.
 I am not for those in mud that crawl.
 And forever doomed shall be the one
 Who betrays my secrets one by one.

It also states the proper Ritual in which one buries an acorn to regain his or her powers. Apart from Artemis and his bodyguard, no humans are said to have seen the Book. If a human touches the Book without the fairy's permission it will combust.

Originally, the book was printed in spirals, which is how ancient fairy texts were read. However, reading in circles gave fairies migraines, so normally printed versions have been made (ordinary Gnommish), this is in the typical western version of reading, left-to-right, top-to-bottom.

Buzz baton
A fairy weapon, primarily used by the LEP to incapacitate any foes they may face. They are designed as bludgeoning weapons, and once powered, they will send a 1000 volt shock (10,000 volts in Artemis Fowl and the Atlantis Complex when used by Turnball) into the target- presumably enough to incapacitate a fairy, but insufficient when used against a human. An LEPretrieval squad attempted to use them against Butler in the Fowl Manor siege, but to no avail.

Centaurian
A script only known by centaurs.  The cipher is slightly easier to translate than Gnommish because many of the symbols look similar to their English counterparts. It can be read fluently once familiar, and is more like a recognisable font than a language.

Camfoil
A thin sheet of foil that is wrapped around the body to imitate invisibility and to blend in with the surrounding environment. The foil is dotted with a series of micro-cameras, which enable the sheet to make an image of the wearer's background. Unfortunately, the entire surface uses circuits, which means that the invisibility can fail in rain or if the sheet is flattened by an object.

In Artemis Fowl and the Lost Colony, however, Eoin Colfer states that the cam-foils are made of fairy-made diamonds that reflect light regardless of the direction and angle of viewing. Crushing the beads causes the sheet to fail.

DNA cannons
A specialized cannon designed to incapacitate any creature whose DNA is coded into the cannon with a laser. Most notably, the Koboi Laboratories is protected with DNA stun cannons.

Iris-cam
A tiny LEP-issue camera within a contact lens; once attached to the user's eye, it is virtually invisible. However, to lower visibility, fairies tend to use one that matches their eye color. In The Eternity Code, Artemis uses a hazel-colored lens, causing Jon Spiro to realize that something is "wrong with [his] eyes". It is used as a remote camera, which also has several filters, including thermal and x-ray. Whenever one changes filters, a small shock passes through the iris-cam, which may cause discomfort. The invention of the iris cam won Foaly a school science project, Opal Koboi being runner up with her wing designs.

LEP Helmet
Part of the official LEP uniform, the LEP Helmet was developed by Foaly. The helmet includes a motion-sensor filter which flags moving objects "with an orange corona". The casing of the LEP helmet is made of impregnable polymer.  An LEP helmet contains a visor, a camera, two 400-watt lamps, and a pollution mask, as well as a microphone, and loudspeaker. All LEP helmets have a self-destruct system which can be activated remotely. When activated, the self-destruct system releases acid, which dissolves the helmet and anyone who was wearing it. Section Eight helmets, which are more sophisticated than normal LEP helmets, have more advanced functions, such as a visor with digital display, plus all of a normal LEP helmet's capabilities. Section Eight helmets can also be controlled from Haven and be moved around independently using microbead bags and the officers Section 8 helmet also have flying thrusters as demonstrated by Foaly in the fifth book.

Magnastrips
Magnastrips power the automobiles in Haven City. LEP automobiles have the ability to push other vehicles out of the way in case of emergency During the lockdown in Artemis Fowl and the Eternity Code, all non-emergency vehicles lost power.

Medi-Pac
Invented by Foaly, the medi-pac is an ice pack infused with magic healing crystals. Activated by crumpling the crystals together, it is applied to the wounded area. It is not as effective as magic, but it can be useful in a tight spot.

Mesmer
A magical power, similar to hypnosis, that most of the fairy families are able to use, since only a small amount of magic is needed to mesmerize someone. It is even said that some humans have the power to do it. Someone who is under the mesmer has no control over their actions, and becomes entranced with the voice of the one mesmerizing. It requires direct eye contact, as well as a voice laced with suggestion; thus, the mesmer is useless against mirrored surfaces such as mirrored sunglasses or mirrored contact lenses, it is shown that a person of high intelligence can resist the mesmer, such as at the beginning of Artemis Fowl, the Arctic Incident when Holly was using the mesmer against Butler to command him to put down his weapon. Butler had been able to resist the mesmer although he gave in in the end. It is also notable that the Book forbids fairies from "mesmerizing" other fairies. It is also said that if someone resists the mesmer too much, his or her brain cells might be fried. If a someone is constantly mesmerized their pupils become increasingly ragged until they eventually go blind. In Book 6, The Time Paradox, Butler had a heart attack when he tried to resist Opal Koboi's mesmer. It is also stated in Book 7, Artemis Fowl and the Atlantis Complex, that when a person was mesmerized, "A large part of their brains were switched off and the parts left awake were not going to be winning any Nobel prizes".

Mind-wipe
The mind-wipe is a technology designed to erase parts of sentient memory, usually human. Any sighting of the People by a human being is erased from the memory of any humans involved. The mind-wipe has two forms; the block wipe, which obliterates the memory of a set period of time from the targeted mind, and the fine-tuned wipe, designed to remove only specific memories from the targeted mind. It was also mentioned that a block mind-wipe can cause a drop in IQ. A part of the process not fully understood by the People is that human minds usually invent new memories to fill in the gaps. However, if a human (or fairy for that matter) sees something related to what was mind wiped from them, the brain recalls the lost information. Example: You have been mind wiped to forget that a fairy shot you with a Neutrino 3000. If you later see a Neutrino 3000, "residual memories" may be sparked, and you will start to remember what happened.

Artemis Fowl II, Domovoi Butler and Juliet all submitted to a fine-tune mind-wipe at the end of The Eternity Code, but Artemis and Butler managed to initiate a total recall through a disk containing specific knowledge to trigger recall. Artemis' was an in-depth description of his escapades, as was Butler's, but Butler was able to recall all the memories totally after hearing merely his first name, Domovoi. There was nothing on the disk for Juliet, although Juliet herself achieves total recall in The Atlantis Complex, by listening to Turnball mesmerizing people.

Mood blanket
The mood blanket is a multi-sensor massage and homeopathic garment meant for centaurs, created by Foaly.

Mud People
The terms 'Mud People', 'Mud Men', 'Mud Woman', 'Mud Maid', 'Mud Boy', 'Mud Girl', 'Mud Kid,' and 'Mud Whelp' are generalizations used by fairies to address humans. This term comes from the age of the Battle of Taillte, when the People were battling the "Mud People" to stay above ground, they gave up due to overwhelming numbers. Apparently, the human race once lived in mud, hence the term “Mud People”. This term also conveys fairies' dislike and even contempt towards the human race because of their pollution and the fact that humans forced fairies underground (partly because fairies can only have a child every twenty years).

Neutrino 500
This is the most basic model of the Neutrino in the Artemis Fowl books.  It is used in the short story "LEPrecon".  It is only mentioned in this story and is currently outdated.

Neutrino 2000
The latest, lightweight model of fairy handguns, with three settings: "Scorched, well done, and crisped to a cinder." The Neutrinos are nuclear powered, so they have almost unlimited ammunition. Neutrinos can only knock out people, they can't kill. The gun shoots an orange beam of heat at the target.

Neutrino 3000
The new version of the Neutrino 2000 that Foaly designed after the B'wa Kell rebellion. The guns are registered to only respond to one person, and every shot loosed by the Neutrino 3000 is recorded on a computer log. There are no metal parts, and, as Foaly describes, it is "powered by kinetics, the motion of your body, with a backup mini-nuke cell... The casing is virtually impregnable".

Omnitool
A device that is capable of picking most human locks. Seen in Artemis Fowl and the Eternity Code and Artemis Fowl and the Time Paradox.
Holly's mother had one, which she passed down to Holly upon the former’s death. However, Mulch Diggums stole it during the Hamburg Incident as mentioned in The Time Paradox' and "Artemis Fowl" (first book)

Pressure Elevators
Powered by "gaseous columns vented from the earth's core", fairies can ride in titanium eggs or more leisurely shuttles to the surface to perform the Ritual or for other business. The elevators are natural vents which allow magma streams to shoot toward the surface; these irregular pressure releases are watched by the LEP technicians, and "flare-prediction teams" are accurate to about a tenth of a second with a 99.8% accuracy rating.

Retimager
A piece of fairy technology developed by Foaly that infallibly tells whether or not a person has seen a specific image before. Based on the premise that every image that a person sees leaves an infinitesimal etching on the retina that never disappears and therefore cannot be fooled by a mind-wipe, two suction cups resembling plungers are used to read the etchings on the subject's retinas. The seals on the suction cups are implanted with micro needles, which inject sedative through the subject's pores.

The Ritual
The Ritual is explained in the Book (the "Fairy Bible").  It consists of picking an acorn from an ancient oak tree at a bend in a river during a full moon and planting it far from the ancient oak. When a fairy does this, his or her magic is replenished. In Artemis Fowl and the Time Paradox, it is shown that magic may be replenished with the help of a warlock, demonstrated by No1.  In Artemis Fowl, Artemis and Butler captured Holly Short while she was attempting to complete the Ritual.
An extract from the Fairy Bible describing the Ritual reads,
"From the earth thine power flows, 
Given through courtesy, so thanks are owed. 
Pluck thou the magick seed, 
Where full moon, ancient oak and twisted water meet. 
And bury it far from where it was found, 
So return your gift into the ground."

Sentinel
A computer system invented by Foaly that monitors all human telecommunications and reviews phone calls with fairy-related "buzzwords". Because of the sheer amount of fairy-related culture, this method was somewhat unreliable for detecting breaches of security.

Shielding
A shield is a form of magic which allows the user to stay invisible to most observers. Fairies shield by increasing their heart rate, causing their bodies to vibrate so quickly that they are never in one place long enough to be seen by the naked eye. Usually, when using the shield, the fairy encounters resistance from non-vibrating clothing, equipment, etc., which causes a slight shimmer in the air. A shielded fairy would cause any object they were sitting upon to shatter under the high vibrations. Fairies have difficulty shielding in areas with high levels of radiation, like northern Russia.
A shielded fairy can also be seen by if an anti-shield filter or by a high-speed camera, but requires viewers to look at the video frame by frame. In The Atlantis Complex, Butler and Juliet see a shielded fairy using a type of sunglasses that Artemis had created which enable the wearer to see through fairy shields. However, rats and two species of monkey can naturally see through the shield.

Softnose laser
The softnose laser is an illegal type of laser weapon with a lifetime of less than ten years. They were originally powered with solar cells, but were adapted to be powered by simple AA alkaline batteries in The Arctic Incident. The softnose fires a laser at a slower speed, penetrating the target (instead of incapacitating), causing greater damage than a normal laser. The B'wa Kell goblin triad was armed with these weapons by Opal Koboi in the failed storming of Police Plaza.

Solinium 2
A radioactive element, still not in the human periodic table. It has a half-life of 14 seconds and is the main energy source of a bio-bomb.

Solinium 
The "bio bomb" used by the LEP utilizes Solinium in order to kill only living tissue. It is standard procedure to spray any LEP property with solinium-based tracker, as shown in The Arctic Incident. Foaly was able to find Mulch Diggums by tracking the gold he stole from the Fowl Manor Siege. Artemis Fowl also used a Solinium-based device, concealed in a button on his bodyguard Butler's jacket, to prevent electronic devices spying on him in Spain, as seen in The Lost Colony – it is noted by Butler that they "may have ruined a few honeymoon videos", showing the Solinium wipes digital visual recordings as well as preventing them.

Time-stop
A tool used by the Fairies in the Artemis Fowl series. It stops time in a selected area using magic. Historically, time-stop fields were created by five warlocks who created a pentagram around the intended area. However, the process was mechanized by Foaly; the warlocks send their magic into lithium batteries, in which it can be stored until needed. Time-stops cut off an area entirely from the outside world; communications to the "outside world" are rendered useless, as nothing is able to penetrate the field. Once in a time-stop, it is impossible to change one's state of consciousness. If, upon entering the field, one is conscious, then it will be impossible to fall asleep, and vice versa. However, if one's state of consciousness is artificially changed (using sleeping pills, for example), the person in question will have dropped out of the time-stopped area into the outside world. The person will later wake up after the time-stop has disappeared, while to anyone still in the time-stop, the person will have disappeared.

Warlock
A fairy with strong magic skills who is highly trained in the magical arts. In the past warlocks have been used to stop time and wipe minds. In modern times, since Foaly "had them do their thing into lithium batteries," Warlocks are still trained in the magical arts, but their training leans more towards the medical sides, such as emergency medicine. Most warlocks have a strong pacifist creed.

Demon Warlock
Demon Warlocks are the most powerful warlocks by far, and risked being shunned by other demons owing to the fact normal demons are bloodthirsty and non-magical. Their powers extend to time-travel and firing bolts of magic. In the 21st century, only three Demon Warlocks are still alive: Qwan was the only survivor of the petrification following Leon Abbot's interference in the time-spell; his apprentice Qweffor was melded with Abbot and eventually suppressed in the Leader's mind, and No 1 was the first Warlock born since the time-spell. Following the return of the Demon island Hybras to Earth, No 1 releases Qweffor from Abbot's control, and begins training under Qwan.

Other concepts

C Cube
A device made by Artemis Fowl II from stolen fairy technology in Artemis Fowl and the Eternity Code''. It can read any medium, electronic or organic, because it contains an "omnisensor", a piece of fairy technology that can sense anything. It was stolen by Jon Spiro, and had to be retrieved because it has the potential to compromise the People's security. It is encoded with an Eternity Code (see below).

Eternity Code
Created by Artemis Fowl II, it is a code like any other code, except that it uses a completely new language as a base language, making it next to impossible to translate. As noted by one of Jon Spiro's staff members,  Dr. Pearson, and Artemis Fowl II himself, theoretically it would take an eternity to get through the code.

References

Artemis Fowl